Timothy Guy Gerard Powles (born 21 December 1959) is a New Zealand music producer and artist. Also known as "timEbandit" Powles, his main instrument and first love was the drums and percussion in general, though over time he's become a dab hand on a medium-sized pile of instruments and gadgets, not to mention the studio itself- and virtual instruments as they occur.

Early career
Powles started his music career at Nelson College, which he attended from 1973 to 1977. He subsequently moved to Wellington and then Auckland to join the band Flight X-7. In the 1970s he won a scholarship to join the New Zealand Youth Orchestra in a training camp in Cambridge. His interest in both classical and rock orchestrations and ambience has continued throughout his career, and was instrumental in his becoming the drummer with the Australian-formed band The Church, with whom he was inducted into the ARIA Hall Of FAME in October 2010, coinciding with the band's 30 year anniversary celebrations and touring.

Powles eventually moved to Australia in 1981 where he first became known in 1980s' band The Venetians. With this band in particular through the 1980s he learned his production skills working alongside greats like Vic Coppersmith-Heaven and Mark Goldenberg, and locals Mark Opitz and Mark Moffatt, often in the Festival Records Studios.

The Church

He started working with The Church in 1994, with the album Sometime Anywhere (though he was misidentified as "Tim Powell" on the liner notes of that album). He became a permanent member of the band in the year following. He sings the lead vocal on the track "Take Your Place" on The Church album Pharmakoi/Distance Crunching Honchos with Echo Units  (1996, as The Refo:mation, Phantom Records) and has worked on all of their many releases since then, as a musician and composer, and taking production responsibilities on all levels. A highlight of these responsibilities was Powles' co-directing and co-producing A Psychedelic Symphony - The Church and the George Ellis Orchestra at the Sydney Opera House, a sold-out show in April 2011. He produced the band's 25th album Further/Deeper in 2014, and th band toured that album extensively thru Europe and USA 2015 and 2016.

Production work

Powles resides in Sydney, Australia and has his own recording studio; the current version is called Spacejunk III. Amongst others, timEbandit has produced albums/EPs/ singles of varying genres and styles for Skulker (debut), Switchkicker (debut), The Camels (debut), Regular John (he was ARIA-nominated for Producer of the Year for their debut album in 2009 - and then produced the follow up Strange Flowers; Jack River (Holly Rankin project);  Hammock Departure Songs (double album, mixed in Nashville); The Khanz (numerous singles and 2 EPs); Iota and the Beauty Queens; Laura Imbruglia (debut album); Winters Wish,  Montpelier,  The Faults...... (a constantly growing and always eclectic list).

Powles's official website is www.spacejunk.biz.

He released a solo album, Tyg's in Space (on Spacejunk' thru Phantom Records), in 1999.

Currently he is working on multiple solo collaborations for imminent release. He features with a cameo vocal on Nashville post-rock ambient band Hammock's recent EP Asleep In The Downlights, a band whose most recent albums he has co-produced and/or mixed.

Spacejunk Production House

"Combined with a reputation as one of Australia's most solid and diversely experienced drummers (The Church, The Divinyls, Rose Tattoo, Dragon, The Venetians, to name a few), this massive depth of experience makes Tim a 'big picture' producer in the true 'A&R' sense of the word. Allowing instinct and 'accident' to flourish and thrive are key ingredients on Tim's production canvas."

References

External links
Spacejunk studio website

1959 births
Living people
The Church (band) members
New Zealand new wave musicians
People educated at Nelson College